Vira Narasimha II (r. 1220–1234) was a king of the Hoysala Empire. During his reign the Hoysalas gained much influence in the affairs of the Tamil country. He defeated the Kadavas and Pandyas and levied a tribute. He acted as a support to Chola king Rajaraja Chola III, who was possibly his son-in-law, against Pandya incursions. During his rule, Vira Narasimha  made Kannanur Kuppam near Srirangam his second capital, with an intent to maintain close watch and control over affairs in Tamil country. Later he fought for the Chola cause again and marched all the way to Rameswaram. The Kannada poet Sumanobana was the court poet of King Vira Narasimha II.

Wars with Pandyas
During the rule of Vira Narasimha II, a Hoysala army was stationed at Kanchi possibly to avert any
incursion from the Telugu Chodas of Nellore, the Kakatiya dynasty of Warangal and the Pandyas of Madurai. The Chola monarch Rajaraja III defied the Pandyas by not paying their annual tribute. Sundara Pandya went on the offensive and routed the Cholas in the battle of Tellaru. Vira Narasimha II rushed to the aid of the Cholas, defeated the South Arcot chiefs and captured Srirangam. Magadai Mandalam was invaded again in 1220–1238. The Hoysala commanders Appanna and Samudra-Gopayya then reached Chidambaram, routing on their way the Kopperunjinga chiefs who were a Pandya ally, in the battle of Perumbalur. Finally, receiving news that the Kopperunjinga chiefs were willing to set free the Chola monarch Rajaraja III from Sendamangalam where he was held captive and consider the Cholas a free kingdom, the Hoysalas escorted the Chola monarch back to Kanchi in 1231. At the same time, Vira Narasimha II himself had defeated Sundara Pandya in the battle of Mahendramangalam. At Srirangam, Narasimha II built a mantapa (mandapam) in the temple during his halt there en route the march against the Pandya. The Koyilolugu recording the history of the Srirangam temple mentions the Kannada king Vira Narasimharaya II to have built the mantapa in the temple and is said to have set up a pillar of victory at Setu (Rameswaram).

References

 Dr. Suryanath U. Kamat, A Concise history of Karnataka from pre-historic times to the present, Jupiter books, MCC, Bangalore, 2001 (Reprinted 2002) OCLC: 7796041 
 K.A. Nilakanta Sastri, History of South India, From Prehistoric times to fall of Vijayanagar, 1955, OUP, New Delhi (Reprinted 2002),  

1235 deaths
Hoysala kings
Hindu monarchs
Year of birth unknown
13th-century Indian monarchs
13th-century Hindus